Defender 2000 is a side-scrolling shoot 'em up video game developed by Llamasoft and published by Atari Corporation for the Atari Jaguar on December 1995. Part of Atari Corp.'s 2000 series, it is a remake by Jeff Minter of Eugene Jarvis and Larry DeMar's 1981 arcade game Defender, which drew inspiration from Space Invaders and Asteroids.

It follows a mostly similar premise to the original Defender with a few new additions. The player, as a member of the System Defense Team taking control of the Threshold spacecraft, is tasked to protect the working space miners and defeat invading waves of aliens from the Alpha Proximian Empire, who seek to obtain the life-sustaining materials humans extract in multiple planets for an Earth that lacks natural resources in the future.

Defender 2000 received mixed reviews since its launch. Reviewers typically commented that the game, while reasonably fun, failed to update the original Defender to the point where its gameplay and graphics could stand out against contemporary shooters.

Gameplay 

Defender 2000 builds upon the gameplay from the original Defender by introducing more power-ups, bonus levels, more and sophisticated enemy types and level designs varying in thematic, among other new additions. The game features a total of 100 levels, with new color variations for the stages after level 50. Progress is automatically saved after completing five levels via the cartridge's internal EEPROM, which also keeps tracks of the high-scores and other settings made by the player across the three game modes available at the start of the game. Completing all 100 levels in Defender 2000 mode unlocks Vindaloo mode, which is a harder difficulty setting. The game also features support for the ProController.

The main objective across the three game modes is to protect the space miners from being abducted by alien invaders of the Alpha Proximian Empire, while also trying to survive and score points as long as possible by destroying enemy ships, which is done by navigating either to the left or right of the planet's terrain. The player's ship has rapid-fire capabilities to shoot down enemies fast and three screen-clearing smart bombs at the start that destroy all enemies in their radius. As with the original game, defeating all of the aliens in the playfield allows the player to progress to the next level, while failing to protect the miners causes the planet to explode and the level to become populated with mutants. Surviving the waves of mutants result in the restoration of the planet and the miners themselves. Players can also accidentally kill a miner with their main weapon.

New to Defender 2000 are power-ups, which appear as sphere-shaped capsules after destroying a number of enemy ships and projectiles from certain enemy types. Grabbing the power-up will increase the score multiplier, while also activating any of the progressively useful capabilities, such as AI-controlled droids, shields and more. Catching a falling human after destroying an enemy will grant a wave shot that destroys enemies and is harmless for the humans, and if a droid ship grabs a falling human, will grant fire capabilities for it as well. If a human is abducted by the enemy, they not only turn into mutants that attack the Threshold ship, but also leave a falling headstone capable of harming the player's ship. Bonus levels can be accessed by collecting a number of warp powerups. If they are successfully cleared, the player skips five levels ahead.

Other game modes are Classic Defender, a recreation of the original arcade game, and Defender Plus, which plays mostly similar to Classic mode, but with updated graphics and a few new additions such as a secondary lightning weapon for the player's ship, warp gates that either teleport the player to the next stretch of the planet's terrain or to the nearest human in trouble, acting similarly to the main mechanic in Stargate and the sequel to the original game. Entering specific names on the high-score table of any game mode enables cheat codes and unlocks two mini-games: Plasma Pong and Flossie Defender. Two players can also play in any of the three modes by taking turns.

Development and release 
In September 1994, Atari Corporation and Williams Entertainment announced their partnership that included plans to update and release some of Williams' early arcade games for the Jaguar such as Defender, Joust and Robotron, with Atari handling the publishing of these titles. Six months later Defender 2000 was announced to be in development for the Jaguar. It was also revealed that Jeff Minter, who was previously involved with Tempest 2000, was working on the game and that it would feature three gameplay modes.

Defender 2000 made its appearance on the showfloor of WCES 1995, E3 1995 and Autumn ECTS '95. It was also covered by the magazine press that were invited to Atari Corporation's US and UK divisions. During development of the game, Minter said he felt the game would most likely be for the Atari Jaguar CD, and that he intended to use the extra space of the CD-ROM format for a documentary section which would include, among other things, an interview with Eugene Jarvis, one of the creators of the original Defender. The music was composed by Alastair Lindsay. The voice work was done by former Atari tester Tal Funke-Bilu.

Defender 2000 kept being advertised to be released for the Jaguar CD. It was originally slated for an October 1995 release and was later pushed back to November. However, these plans were cancelled at some point during development and the game was instead released as a cartridge. The animations for the humans in Plus and 2000 modes were created using motion capture. Minter himself has since referred to the game as "not one of my best works", due to issues that occurred during the game's development process when he was an employee of Atari Corporation. The game was also showcased during the Fun 'n' Games Day event hosted by Atari.

Reception 

Defender 2000 received mostly mediocre reviews. GamePro remarked that while Defender 2000 updated the arcade original's graphics to the modern generation of consoles, the graphics were below average for that generation, and the gameplay was not similarly updated. The reviewer also criticized the "slippery steering" and outdated sound effects, and concluded: "Defender still supplies Jag owners with adequate shooting. But that reflects more on the quality of the Jag's game library than on this game." Game Players likewise said that Defender 2000 does virtually nothing to update the gameplay of the original Defender, and that the reviewer spent nearly all of his time with the game playing "Classic Defender", though he found the original Defender was strong enough to make Defender 2000 one of the better Jaguar games to date.

Next Generation contended that the original Defender was only significant because of its remarkable originality, and that the gameplay had not aged well. They commented that, "When isolated from its heritage, Defender 2000 is a fun, good-looking, side-scrolling shooter charged with a pulsing soundtrack. But that description could tag any number of recent shooters."

ST Format completely panned the game, stating that the "Classic Defender" mode is a poor conversion of the original with "astonishingly easy" enemies, "Defender Plus" mode is marred by blinding blue-dominated graphics, and in "Defender 2000" mode it is impossible to tell what is going on due to the vertical scrolling frequently keeping the characters the player is supposed to protect off-screen and the garish over-the-top visuals obscuring everything that appears on-screen. They added that in spite of this, "Defender 2000" is boringly easy, and concluded that the game as a whole "makes a total mess of Defender". Computer and Video Games, in contrast, said that "Classic Defender" is "an excellently faithful conversion" with the only noticeable difference being the animation when the player's ship is destroyed. They agreed that the graphics in the two enhanced modes are "hideous" and "revolting", but found that if given a chance the gameplay in "Defender 2000" mode is fast-paced and satisfying, and concluded that, while not as stylish and polished as Minter's earlier Jaguar game Tempest 2000, Defender 2000 was "a decent enough follow-up".

Despite their bleak review of the game, GamePro later awarded it Best Jaguar Game of 1995.

References

External links 
 
 Defender 2000 at AtariAge
 Defender 2000 at GameFAQs
 Defender 2000 at MobyGames

1995 video games
Atari games
Atari Jaguar games
Atari Jaguar-only games
Horizontally scrolling shooters
Llamasoft games
Multiplayer and single-player video games
Atari video game compilations
Video game remakes
Video games developed in the United States
Video games scored by Alastair Lindsay
Video games set in the future
Video games with digitized sprites
Williams video games